Qiang language, referred as Rma (尔玛) or Rme  by its speakers, is a Sino-Tibetan language cluster of the Qiangic branch spoken by approximately 140,000 people in north-central Sichuan Province, China.

Qiang consists of:
Northern Qiang language (a non-tonal language)
Southern Qiang language (a tonal language)

Writing system

In 2017, the Rma script, invented by Wei Jiuqiao, was officially finalized and has been accepted by many Qiang people as the first ever official writing system for their language. There is no published information regarding to whether the script is compatible for both the Northern Qiang language and the Southern Qiang language or if it is only compatible for one of the languages. The writing system has also been given a preliminary proposal to encode it to the Universal Character Set of Unicode.

Consonants

Vowels

Classification
Sims (2016) gives the following classification for the "Qiangish" (or "Rma") languages, which include Northern Qiang and Southern Qiang. Individual dialects are highlighted in italics.
Qiangish
Northern Qiang ('upstream' *nu- innovation group)
NW Heishui: Luhua 芦花镇
Central Heishui
Qinglang 晴朗乡
Zhawo 扎窝乡
Ciba 慈坝乡
Shuangliusuo 双溜索乡
uvular V's innovation group: Zhimulin 知木林乡, Hongyan 红岩乡, Mawo 麻窝乡
SE Heishui: Luoduo 洛多乡, Longba 龙坝乡, Musu 木苏乡, Shidiaolou 石碉楼乡
North Maoxian: Taiping 太平乡, Songpinggou 松坪沟乡
South Songpan: Xiaoxing 小姓乡, Zhenjiangguan 镇江关乡, Zhenping 镇坪乡
West Maoxian / South Heishui: Weigu 维古乡, Waboliangzi 瓦钵乡梁子, Se'ergu 色尔古镇, Ekou, Weicheng 维城乡, Ronghong, Chibusu, Qugu 曲谷乡 [basis for written language], Wadi 洼底乡, Baixi 白溪乡, Huilong 回龙乡, Sanlong 三龙乡
Central Maoxian: Heihu 黑虎乡
SE Maoxian (reflexive marker innovation): Goukou 沟口乡, Yonghe 永和乡
Southern Qiang (perfective agreement suffixes innovation group)
'inward' *ji innovation subgroup
North Wenchuan: Longxi 龙溪乡
South Wenchuan: Miansi 绵虒镇
'downward' *ɚ innovation subgroup
Western Lixian: Puxi 蒲溪乡, Xuecheng 薛城镇, Muka 木卡乡, Jiuzi 九子村
Eastern Lixian: Taoping 桃坪乡, Tonghua 通化乡

Reconstruction
Sims (2017) reconstructs tones for Proto-Rma (alternatively called Proto-Qiangish), proposing that the lack of tones in Northern Qiang is due to Tibetan influence. High tones and low tones are reconstructed for Proto-Rma, as well as for Proto-Prinmi.

References

Bibliography

 
 
 

Qiangic languages
Qiang people